Benjamin Collett Mills is a British singer who finished in third place on the third series of The X Factor in 2006.

After the show, Mills signed a five-album record deal with SonyBMG. His debut album, Picture of You, was released on 12 March 2007. His debut single was advertised as "Beside You" and set to be released on 5 March 2007, but it was pulled by the record company at the last minute. The reason given was to concentrate on album sales.

Early life and career
Mills was a co-director of a marquee hire company in his home town of Whitstable before appearing on The X Factor.

He gained a diploma in music from the Academy of Contemporary Music in Guildford, Surrey and has been singing since he was a child. He also plays piano and guitar. He was also a keyboard player in the tribute band to The Doors called The L.A. Doors and toured the pub and club circuit with his own band called Benzego.

Mills' audition song for The X Factor was "Bring It On Home To Me" by Sam Cooke, which impressed the panel of judges; Simon Cowell thought he sounded like a young Joe Cocker, whom, incidentally, Ben names as one of his musical influences along with Tom Waits, Rod Stewart and David Bowie. During his time on The X Factor he was mentored by Sharon Osbourne.

He performed at Pontins Holiday Camp in Blackpool, England in Oct 2008. He performed at Pontins Holiday Camp in Prestatyn, Wales in May 2009.

His second album, Freedom, was released on 8 March 2010, and launched on 13 March 2010 at the Gulbenkian Theatre in Canterbury.

Personal life
On 24 August 2007, Mills was a celebrity guest in an episode of the live television programme Doctor, Doctor broadcast on channel Five, in which he talked about his personal life and former drug-related problems with the presenter and general practitioner, Mark Porter. On live television Mills explained that he first took cocaine when he went on tour with a band, and from that moment he wanted to take more. He reported that the tour lasted for four years, that he became a heavy cocaine user, his social network became drug-orientated and he reached a nadir; he was having to borrow money, his girlfriend left him, he was not turning up for gigs, and he had lost his confidence. He said that he realised he had to change his life after spending three or four days on a beach in December, so he telephoned a counsellor who helped him to rehabilitate. After his recovery he successfully took part in The X Factor.

Mills announced his engagement to longtime girlfriend, Melissa, in April 2009. They were married at Blean Church in July 2009.

In June 2011, Ben performed at the Music on the Hill festival at West Malling in Kent, on behalf of Demelza Hospice Care for Children, together with Katherine Jenkins, McFly, ABC, and Björn Again.

Discography

References

External links
 Official website

Living people
The X Factor (British TV series) contestants
English male singers
English rock singers
English rock guitarists
English rock pianists
English keyboardists
People from Chatham, Kent
Sony BMG artists
Musicians from Kent
English male guitarists
Male pianists
21st-century pianists
21st-century British male musicians
Year of birth missing (living people)